Mummuciona is a monotypic genus of ammotrechid camel spiders, first described by Carl Friedrich Roewer in 1934. Its single species, Mummuciona simoni is distributed in Colombia and Venezuela.

References 

Solifugae
Arachnid genera
Monotypic arachnid genera
Fauna of Colombia
Fauna of Venezuela
Taxa described in 1934